Ural (Bashkir and ) is a rural locality (a village) in Rasmekeyevsky Selsoviet, Kushnarenkovsky District, Bashkortostan, Russia. The population was 54 as of 2010. There is 1 street.

Geography 
Ural is located 16 km southwest of Kushnarenkovo (the district's administrative centre) by road. Baytally is the nearest rural locality.

References 

Rural localities in Kushnarenkovsky District